Thomas Poussin was a 17th-century French architect.

Born in Dinan, he worked on the north side of the Saint-Malo Cathedral from 1595 to 1607, as well as on military constructions in Dinan, Saint-Malo and the region. He participated in the construction of the Palace of the Parlement de Bretagne from 1624 to 1631.

Sources 
 Jacques Salbert,  Ateliers de retabliers lavallois aux XVIIe and XVIIIe: études historiques et artistiques, Presses Universitaires de Rennes, 1976.

References 

Renaissance architects
17th-century French architects
People from Dinan